Glyptolepis baltica is an extinct species of lobe-finned fishes belonging to the family Holoptychiidae.

It is found in Estonia.

References

Porolepiformes